George Michael Live in Australia was a concert tour by English singer-songwriter George Michael. For the first time since his Faith Tour in 1988, Michael returned to Australia in 2010 to perform his three live concerts.

History
With the tour having had three concerts in Australia, the shows featured songs from his solo career and classics from his time in Wham!

Setlist 

 "Waiting (Reprise)"
 "Fastlove"
 "I'm Your Man"
 "Father Figure"
 "Everything She Wants"  
 "One More Try"   
 "An Easier Affair"  
 "Too Funky"   Break
 "Faith" 
 "Spinning the Wheel"
 "Feeling Good"   
 "Roxanne"
 "Amazing"
 "Flawless (Go to the City)"
 "Outside"Encore
 "Careless Whisper"
 "Freedom '90"

Personnel 
The band 
 George Michael - vocals
 Chris Cameron - musical director, keyboards, arranger
 Lea Mullen - percussion
 Phil Palmer - guitars
 Andy Hamilton (pop saxophonist) - sax, keyboards, EWI (Electronic Wind Instrument)
 Steve Walters - bass
 Mike Brown - guitars
 Carlos Hercules - drums
 Graham Kearns - guitars
 Luke Smith - keyboards
 Shirley Lewis - backing vocals
 Jay Henry - backing vocals
 Lincoln Jean-Marie - backing vocals
 Lori Perry - backing vocals
 Sharon Perry - backing vocals
 Lucy Jules - backing vocals

Management and production 
 Michael Lippman - artist manager
 Andy Stephens - artist manager
 Ken Watts - tour director
 Lisa Johnson - assistant tour director
 Looloo Murphy - GM tour manager
 Sharon Ashley - band tour manager
 Ronnie Franklin - security consultant
 Mark Spring - production manager
 Di Eichorst - production coordinator
 Scott Chase - stage manager
 James Kelly - show manager
 Willie Williams - video staging designer and director
 Vince Foster - set and lighting design and operator
 Gary Bradshaw - front of house sound
 Andy Bramley - video director
 Barrie Marshall and Doris Dixon - agents
pen

Shows

References
Notes

External links
 Official website

2010 concert tours
George Michael concert tours